Baggot Street is a street in Dublin, Ireland.

Location
The street runs from Merrion Row (near St. Stephen's Green) to the northwestern end of Pembroke Road. It crosses the Grand Canal near Haddington Road. It is divided into two sections: 
Lower Baggot Street - between Merrion Row and the Grand Canal. It was called Gallows Road in the 18th century.
Upper Baggot Street - south of the Grand Canal until the junction with Eastmoreland Place, where it continues as Pembroke Road.

History 
On a 1756 map of Dublin, Baggot Street is marked as The Road to Ball's-Bridge, and in 1800 Baggot Street Upper was marked as Blackrock Road. Baggot Street is named after Baggotrath, the manor granted to Robert Bagod in the 13th century. He built Baggotrath Castle, which was partly destroyed during the Battle of Rathmines and demolished in the early nineteenth century. The street was called Baggot Street in 1773.

Architecture
Lower Baggot Street is distinguished by Georgian architecture, while Upper Baggot Street has mainly Victorian architecture with a few buildings of 20th-century vintage such as the former Bank of Ireland headquarters, Miesian Plaza. The Royal City of Dublin Hospital, opened in 1834, is on the east side of Upper Baggot Street, just south of the junction with Haddington Road. Cook's Map of 1836 shows the north side of Upper Baggot Street and Pembroke Road almost entirely built on.

Modern development such as the Miesian Plaza has been viewed by some as destructive to a previously unified Georgian streetscape. Journalist Frank MacDonald characterised the Plaza as a more violent interjection on the street than the contemporaneous ESB building on Fitzwilliam Street. On 13 July 1973, two nurses escaped from their flat in number 11 Lower Baggot Street when the back and side walls of the house collapsed following the demolition of three adjoining houses to make way for an office block. The 1978 offices built for Bord na Móna, near the Miesian Plaza, were designed by Sam Stephenson, and won the Buildings in Context award from An Taisce.

People
Darkey Kelly, murderess, executed by burning on Gallows Road (modern Baggot Street) in 1761.
The Sheares Brothers, members of the Society of United Irishmen, who died in the 1798 rebellion, lived at no. 128.
In 1830, Thomas Davis, the revolutionary Irish writer who was the chief organiser and poet of the Young Ireland movement, lived at 67 Lower Baggot Street.
Catherine McAuley, a nun, founded the Sisters of Mercy order in 1831 and built what is now the Mercy International Centre on Lower Baggot Street where she later died in 1841.
In 1909, Francis Bacon was born at 63 Lower Baggot Street.
The poet Patrick Kavanagh frequented Baggot Street and regarded it as his favourite place in Dublin. 
In his poem "If ever you go to Dublin Town" Kavanagh addresses Dubliners 100 years after his own time and tells them to "Inquire for me in Baggot Street/And what I was like to know".

See also
List of streets and squares in Dublin

References

Sources

External links

Royal City of Dublin Hospital

Streets in Dublin (city)